The Guardians of the Cedars (GoC) (Ḥurrās al-Arz; French: Gardiens du Cedre or Gardiens des Cèdres, GdC) are a far-right ultranationalist Lebanese party and former militia in Lebanon. It was formed by Étienne Saqr (also known with the kunya or nom de guerre "Abu Arz" or "Father of the Cedars") and others along with the Lebanese Renewal Party in the early 1970s. It operated in the Lebanese Civil War under the slogan: Lebanon, at your service.

Creation

The Guardians of the Cedars started to form a militia in the years leading up to the Lebanese Civil War and commenced military operations in April 1975.

In September 1975, Communiqué No. 1 was issued to denounce advocates of the partition of Lebanon. The second communiqué contained a bitter attack on the Palestinians. The third articulated the party's attitude on the issue of Lebanese identity: Lebanon should dissociate itself from Arabism. The party spread its messages by means of graffiti in East Beirut, including slogans against Syria, the "Palestinian Resistance", and Pan-Arabism, sometimes with violent anti-Palestinian tones, as in the slogan على كل لبناني ان يقتل فلسطينياً ("It is a duty for each Lebanese to kill a Palestinian").

The Guardians of the Cedars joined other pro-status quo, mainly Christian Lebanese militias in 1976 to form the Lebanese Front.

1970s
In March 1976, they confronted Palestinian and leftist forces in West Beirut. A Guardians unit was also dispatched to Zaarour, above the mountain road to Zahlé, to support Phalangist forces. In April, Guardian fighters held a line in the area of Hadath, Kfar Shima, and Bsaba, south of Beirut, against a coalition of Palestinian, PSP, and SSNP forces.

In the summer of 1976, the Guardians were among the first militias to assault Tel al-Zaatar, the last remaining Palestinian refugee camp in east Beirut. The camp fell after a 52-day siege.

The actions of the Guardians and their allies following the capture of the camp have been widely reported as amounting to a massacre of many of its civilian inhabitants. During this battle, Saqr led a unit of Guardians force to Chekka, where Christian civilians were being sieged by leftist-Palestinian forces, and fought off the Palestinian forces.

The Guardians and allied Christian militias then invaded the Koura region in northern Lebanon and reached Tripoli, to support Christian residents trapped by fighting. In 1978 as part of the Lebanese Front they did small attacks on the Syrian army in Beirut and again in 1981 in the Battle of Zahle. This came after the alliance between the Phalanges and most Christian groups with the Syrians had taken a twist.

During the war, the Guardians earned a reputation for specializing in cruelty. Militia members usually tied Palestinian prisoners to the backs of taxis and then dragged them up the motorway into Jounieh. Their carcasses would then be flung into a dried-up riverbed. Commanding his followers to slay all Palestinians, Saqr once stated, "If you feel compassion for the Palestinian women and children, remember they are communists and will bear new communists".

1980s
In 1985 the Guardians of the Cedars mounted a fierce defense of Kfar-Fallus and Jezzine, battling Palestinians and Shiite-Druze militias and protected thousands of Christians in South Lebanon.

Towards the close of the 1980s, and continuing to 2000, most of the remaining fighting in Lebanon occurred in the south, inside the Israeli-occupied zone, under the Southern-Lebanese-Army influence led by Saad Haddad and later by Antoine Lahd, the latter who had close ties with the National Liberal Party (Al Ahrar in Arabic). The Guardians and other militias were largely reorganized into the South Lebanon Army, preserving much of the early ideology while adopting new military tactics.

Military structure and organization
The LRP militia began to be quietly raised in 1974 by Sakr in his capacity as president of the Party, though it was only in September 1975 when they made their existence public in an official communiqué as the Guardians of the Cedars. Headquartered at the main LRP party' Offices in Ashrafieh and personally commanded by Sakr, the GoC initially numbered some 500 men and women trained by Kayrouz Baraket, a young Lebanese Army officer, and equipped with obsolete firearms purchased on the black market. Although the membership of the GoC was exclusively Maronite, Sakr allegedly maintained a loyal personal bodyguard made up of Lebanese Shia Muslims, but little is known about them. The collapse of the Lebanese Army in January 1976 allowed Sakr to recruit army deserters and seize some heavy equipment from its barracks and Internal Security Forces (ISF) Police stations, swelling the GoC ranks to 3,000-6,000 uniformed militiamen armed with modern small-arms. 
Besides being provided with funds and training by the Kataeb Party and the Al-Tanzim, the Guardians also claimed to have received direct aid from Israel as early as 1974. They were the only faction of the Lebanese Front that never received any military aid from Syria, which is hardly surprising, given their strong anti-Syrian views.

Weapons and equipment
They fielded a mechanized force consisting of a single M50 Super Sherman medium tank, some M113 armored personnel carriers, a few M42 Duster SPAAGs and Chaimite V200 armoured cars backed by gun trucks or technicals. The latter consisted of UAZ-469, Land-Rover series II-III, Santana Series III (Spanish-produced version of the Land-Rover series III), Toyota Land Cruiser (J40), Dodge Power Wagon W200, Dodge D series (3rd generation), Jeep J20 pickup trucks, GMC Sierra Custom K25/K30, Chevrolet C-10/C-15 Cheyenne and Chevrolet C-20 Scottsdale light pickups, plus Chevrolet C-50 medium-duty trucks and GMC C4500 medium-duty trucks, GMC C7500 heavy-duty trucks and M34 2½-ton 6x6 cargo trucks armed with heavy machine guns (HMGs), recoilless rifles and anti-aircraft autocannons.

Activities and areas of operations
In stark contrast to other Christian factions, the LRP/GoC despised any illegal activities such as drug-trafficking, extortion or looting, and their leader Sakr never sought to establish an autonomous personal fiefdom. Although the Guardians' claimed that they did not center their military operations on 'turf', they did maintain strongholds at the Maronite quarters of East Beirut, the adjacent Matn District (Laqluk, near Akoura), the Batroun District (Tannourine), the eastern Keserwan District (Ayoun es-Simane) and the Jabal Amel region (Kfar-Fallus, Jezzine, Marjayoun, Qlaiaa, Ain Ebel and Rumeish). In May 1979 they even clashed with the NLP Tigers Militia in Beirut for control of the Furn esh Shebbak and Ain el-Rammaneh districts, and for the town of Akoura in the Byblos District.

Political beliefs
The Guardians hold to several key beliefs:
 Lebanon is an ancient nation of unique ethnicity.
 Modern Lebanese people descended from the Phoenicians.
 Phoenicia was the father of early Western civilization.

This has led the Guardians of the Cedars to maintain that Lebanese people are not Arabs. The political consequence of this stance advocates the 'de-Arabization' of Lebanon. Similarly, followers draw a distinction between Arabic and 'Lebanese', aiming to restore the form created by Lebanese philosopher Said Akl. The Guardians of the Cedars have adopted positions hostile to Pan-Arabism. This is believed to be the main reason why they did not grow as a party in Lebanon outside the Maronite community.

Saqr himself had fought against pan-Arab forces back in the Lebanon Crisis of 1958. During that time Camille Chamoun entered Lebanon in the Baghdad Pact led by the US, but faced stiff resistance from a huge section of the Lebanese people, and this later led to the failure of this alliance.

After heavy Palestinian involvement in the Lebanese Civil War, the Guardians cultivated ties with the Israeli military, receiving weapons and support. Some followers maintain that this was a collaboration of necessity, and not an ideological agreement with the Israelis. Others disagree, claiming that collaboration with Israel was based on the conviction that there was a commonality of interest between the two countries. Other similarly aligned militias, such as the Phalangists, Ahrar and the Tigers, also cooperated semi-secretly with Israel. This cooperation was later emphasized by Saqr who said: "Lebanon's power is in Israel's power, and Lebanon's weakness lies in Israel's weakness".

This alliance with Israel played a major role in banning the party, and expelling its members who mostly fled to Israel. Saqr, who now lives in Nicosia, Cyprus, has since admitted that Israel has been funding the group throughout its existence, even before the war began. Saqr is now considered as a traitor to the Lebanese government, alongside the likes of Antoine Lahad who resides in Tel Aviv under Mossad protection.

According to an Israeli military observer Haim 'Arev, the soldiers of the Guardians of the Cedars were the best and most experienced fighters among the militias that constituted the Lebanese Front. He draws a direct connection between the patriotic ideology of the Guardians and the superior battle capacity of their fighters. He states that while the Guardians were among the smaller parties of the Lebanese Civil war, its idealistic men and women were soldiers of the best caliber. Later, in Southern Lebanon, the Guardians fighters had a reputation for being exceptionally motivated and among the toughest fighters in the ranks of the SLA.

Front of the Guardians of the Cedar 

The Front of the Guardians of the Cedar – FGoC (Arabic: الجبهة لحراس الأرز transliteration Al-Jabhat li-Hurras el-Arz), sometimes known by its Arabic acronym, JIHA, was a pre-dominantly Christian right-wing grouping that appeared in 1974. Apparently a splinter of the Guardians of the Cedars, they held similar views to those of this party – expressed just prior to the war in anti-Palestinian graffiti bearing the 'JIHA' signature scrubbed in the walls of east Beirut's buildings – very little is known about this small and obscure organization. Estimated at about 100 members, the JIHA operated mainly in the eastern sector of the Lebanese Capital during the 1975-77 phase of the Lebanese Civil War, but nothing was heard from them afterwards. It is assumed that they might have been re-absorbed into the GoC or by the Lebanese Forces in 1977.

Lebanese Renewal Party

The Lebanese Renewal Party – LRP (Arabic: حزب التجدد اللبناني transliteration Hezb al-Tajaddud al-Lubnani) or Parti de la Renovation Libanaise (PRL) in French, is a banned political party in Lebanon formed in 1972 as the political arm of the paramilitary force known as the Guardians of the Cedars. It is often characterized as right-wing extremist, but by its followers as a patriotic nationalist movement. The party is still led by its founder, Étienne Saqr (Abu Arz).

History

It was formed by right-wing activists opposed to the presence of the Palestinian refugees in Lebanon. The refugee population also included a substantial element of Palestine Liberation Organization (PLO) fighters, especially after the 1970 Black September events in Jordan. This created severe tension in Lebanon, and is believed by many to have been a driving factor behind the outbreak of civil war in 1975.

During the Lebanese Civil War, the party and its militia were a small but active part of the Maronite-led alliance fighting the Palestinians represented by the Rejectionist Front and PLO, and its allies in the Lebanese National Movement (LNM) of Kamal Jumblatt. During the early fighting in the war, the party was implicated in the massacres of Karantina and Tel al-Zaatar. In 1977, the main Christian-backed militias (LRP plus the National Liberal Party and the Kataeb Party) formed the Lebanese Front coalition. Their militias joined under the name of the Lebanese Forces, but the Lebanese Forces soon fell under the command of Bashir Gemayel and the Phalange. The Lebanese Renewal Party (LRP) and the Guardians of the Cedars were uncompromisingly opposed to the Syrian occupation of Lebanon.

After the 1982 Lebanon War the party cooperated with Israel Defense Forces, and its militia joined the South Lebanon Army (SLA). After the withdrawal of Israel from Lebanon in 2000, most of the leadership fled to Israel. The group was banned by the Syrian-dominated government and decided to give up its arms to become a traditional political party. It remains banned, and is only a minor force in national life. Still, some of the rhetoric used by the LRP in advocating its domestic policies was revived during the Cedar Revolution in 2005, which forced the withdrawal of Syria from Lebanon and led to expectations of political reform.

Ideological beliefs

The Lebanese Renewal Party is ethnocentric, and believes that Lebanon is not an Arab country. It labored extensively to create or discover non-Arab cultural expressions, and went so far as to design a new alphabet for Lebanese Arabic, which it claims is a language in its own right. Accordingly, the party was staunchly opposed to Pan-Arabism, which was advocated by many in the left-wing Lebanese National Movement (LNM) and Palestinian movements.

Another distinguishing element of the party's politics was that it advocated cooperation with Israel. While there were several other movements on the Christian side in Lebanon that cooperated with Israel during the war, the LNR was the only organization openly and ideologically committed to this, regarding a Lebanese-Israeli axis as the best protection against Arabism and the Palestinians.

Attitude towards Palestinians and Lebanese Muslims

The GoC was strongly anti-Palestinian, and argued for the forcible removal of all Palestinians and other non-Lebanese (e.g. Syrians) from Lebanon, both civilians and armed fighters. Critics labeled this a call for ethnic cleansing or genocide. GoC leader Saqr summed up the organization's attitude to Palestinians in an interview with the Jerusalem Post on July 23, 1982:

"It is the Palestinians we have to deal with. Ten years ago there were 84,000; now there are between 600,000 and 700,000. In six years there will be two million. We can't let it come to that." His solution: "Very simple. We shall drive them to the borders of brotherly Syria ... Anyone who looks back, stops or returns will be shot on the spot. We have the moral right, reinforced by well-organized public relations plans and political preparations."

However, in contrast to the policies of many other sectarian militias (such as the Kataeb), and to their own attitudes towards Palestinians, the Guardians took some care to avoid the impression of religious conflict. The party, while essentially a Christian militia and in violent conflict with most militias during the war, was formally secularist as it publicly stressed this Secular Nationalist identity.

End of the militia
1989 saw the Guardians once more fighting the Syrians alongside the Lebanese Army in support of the military interim government of General Michel Aoun. In a statement in 1990, the GoC greeted the occupation of Kuwait by Saddam Hussein by asserting that "Arabism is the undisputed lie of the 20th century." The Guardians called upon the people to rally around the leadership of General Aoun, and demanded the withdrawal of Lebanon from the Arab League.

As the Lebanese Civil War drew to a close in 1990, political changes weakened the right-wing movements which had existed in earlier decades. In October 1990, as part of the end of the war, the reorganized Lebanese government forced Prime Minister Aoun out of power under Syrian demands and commands. From this year on, Syria occupied Lebanon until its withdrawal in 2005.

Samir Geagea's Lebanese Forces militia captured Etienne Saqr because he had supported Aoun. During this incident, he suffered an unspecified injury. He was forced to seek refuge in Jezzine, and finally left Lebanon for Europe after Israel pulled its forces out of Lebanon. Several other members of the Guardians are presently wanted by the Lebanese government, in order to answer for war-crimes.

From the end of the civil war in 1990 until the Israeli withdrawal from Lebanon in 2000 the Guardians of the Cedars formed an element of the now-defunct South Lebanon Army. Since that date their military operations have ceased and they operate solely politically, campaigning to remove the Syrian presence in Lebanon. In common with the Christian and Sunni-dominated March 14 Alliance, the party has expressed its support for the Syrian uprising.

Movement of Lebanese Nationalism
Today, the reorganized Guardians of the Cedars is a legal and fully functional political party; lately, the term Movement of Lebanese Nationalism (Arabic: حركة القومية اللبنانية transliterated as Harakat al-Qawmiyya al-Lubnaniyya) abbreviated as MLN was added to its name and it is now known as The Guardians of the Cedars Party - Movement of Lebanese Nationalism (in Arabic حزب حراس الأرز- حركة القومية اللبنانية).

See also
Al-Tanzim
Battle of the Hotels
Etienne Saqr
Front for the Liberation of Lebanon from Foreigners
Lebanese Front
Lebanese Forces
Lebanese Civil War
List of weapons of the Lebanese Civil War
Karantina massacre
South Lebanon Army
Siege of Tel al-Zaatar

Footnotes

References

 Edgar O'Ballance, Civil War in Lebanon, 1975-92, Palgrave Macmillan, London 1998. 
 Maria Chakhtoura, La guerre des graffiti, Éditions Dar an-Nahar, Beyrouth 2005. (in French)
 Jennifer Philippa Eggert, Female Fighters and Militants During the Lebanese Civil War: Individual Profiles, Pathways, and Motivations, Studies in Conflict & Terrorism, Taylor & Francis Group, LLC, 2018. –  
 Mordechai Nisan, The Conscience of Lebanon: A Political Biography of Etienne Sakr (Abu-Arz), Frank Cass Publishers, London 2003. 
 Moustafa El-Assad, Blue Steel IV: M-50 Shermans and M-50 APCs in South Lebanon, Blue Steel books, Sidon 2007. 
 Moustafa El-Assad, Civil Wars Volume 1: The Gun Trucks, Blue Steel books, Sidon 2008. 
Robert Fisk, Pity the Nation: Lebanon at War, London: Oxford University Press, (3rd ed. 2001).  – 
 Plonka Arkadiusz, L'idée de langue libanaise d'après Sa'īd 'Aql, Geuthner, Paris 2004.  (in French)
 Samer Kassis, 30 Years of Military Vehicles in Lebanon, Beirut: Elite Group, 2003. 
 Samer Kassis, Véhicules Militaires au Liban/Military Vehicles in Lebanon 1975-1981, Trebia Publishing, Chyah 2012. 
Samir Makdisi and Richard Sadaka, The Lebanese Civil War, 1975-1990, American University of Beirut, Institute of Financial Economics, Lecture and Working Paper Series (2003 No.3), pp. 1–53. – 
Zachary Sex & Bassel Abi-Chahine, Modern Conflicts 2 – The Lebanese Civil War, From 1975 to 1991 and Beyond, Modern Conflicts Profile Guide Volume II, AK Interactive, 2021. ISBN 8435568306073

Further reading

 Fawwaz Traboulsi, A History of Modern Lebanon: Second Edition, Pluto Press, London 2012. 
 Jean Sarkis, Histoire de la guerre du Liban, Presses Universitaires de France - PUF, Paris 1993.  (in French)
 Rex Brynen, Sanctuary and Survival: the PLO in Lebanon, Boulder: Westview Press, Oxford 1990.  – 
 Jonathan Randall, The Tragedy of Lebanon: Christian Warlords, Israeli Adventurers, and American Bunglers, Just World Books, Charlottesville, Virginia 2012. 
 Samir Kassir, La Guerre du Liban: De la dissension nationale au conflit régional, Éditions Karthala/CERMOC, Paris 1994.  (in French)
 Marius Deeb, The Lebanese Civil War, Praeger Publishers Inc., New York 1980. 
 William W. Harris, Faces of Lebanon: Sects, Wars, and Global Extensions, Princeton Series on the Middle East, Markus Wiener Publishers, Princeton 1997. , 1-55876-115-2

External links
Guardians of the Cedars  - Official website

1975 establishments in Lebanon
Christian political parties in Lebanon
Factions in the Lebanese Civil War
Far-right politics in Asia
Israeli–Lebanese conflict
Lebanese Front
Lebanese nationalist parties
Military wings of political parties
Phoenicianism
Political parties in Lebanon